Toechima daemelianum, commonly known as cape tamarind, is an evergreen  tree from north-east Queensland in Australia. It grows up to 13 metres high and a trunk which may be up to 20 cm wide.

The species was formally described in 1875 by Victorian Government Botanist Ferdinand von Mueller in the ninth volume of his Fragmenta Phytographiae Australiae. Mueller placed the species in the genus Cupania, naming it Cupania daemeliana, in honour of Edward Daemel who collected plant material from Cape York.
In 1879, Bavarian botanist Ludwig Radlkofer reassigned the species to the genus Toechima.

Toechima daemelianum is found in dry and riverine rainforest between Cape York and Tully.

References

External links

daemelianum
Trees of Australia
Sapindales of Australia
Flora of Queensland
Taxa named by Ferdinand von Mueller